The Case of Lady Camber is a play by the British writer Horace Annesley Vachell, which was first performed in 1915. The play was a success in the West End, enjoying a lengthy run at the Savoy Theatre. It was not as well received in New York when it opened at the Lyceum Theatre in 1917.

Synopsis
When Lady Camber, an ex-music hall star, dies in mysterious circumstances, suspicion falls on her young nurse Esther Yorke who is suspected of murdering her so she can marry Lord Camber.

Film Adaptations
The play has been turned into films on three occasions:
 A 1920 silent film The Case of Lady Camber, directed by Walter West.
 A 1932 film Lord Camber's Ladies, directed by Benn W. Levy and produced by Alfred Hitchcock
 A 1948 film The Story of Shirley Yorke, directed by Maclean Rogers

References

Bibliography
 Bordman, Gerald. American Theatre: A Chronicle of Comedy and Drama 1914-1930. Oxford University Press, 1995.
 Low, Rachael. The History of the British Film, 1919-1929. George Allen & Unwin, 1971.

1915 plays
British plays adapted into films
Plays set in England
Plays by Horace Annesley Vachell